Asus Fonepad is a series of 6", 7" and 8" tablet computers with mobile cellular telephony capability (and is therefore considered a "phablet") developed by ASUS. The first model, the Fonepad ME371MG, was launched on April 24, 2013 in India, and April 26 in UK. Six months later, in September 2013, the Asus Fonepad 7 2014 Edition was launched, followed by the Fonepad 8, and an upgraded 7, in June 2014.
On August 26, 2014, Asus launched the Asus Fonepad 7 2014 edition (FE7530CXG), which is a 3G phone calling tablet with an Intel Atom Z3560 processor, 1GB RAM, a 7-inch 1280x800 screen, and Android 4.1.2 Jelly Bean.

In 2014 Asus appointed PT Dragon Computer & Communication and PT Metrodata Electronics to distribute Asus Fonepad devices in Indonesia.

References

External links 
 

Fonepad
Asus mobile phones
Android (operating system) devices
Phablets
Mobile phones introduced in 2013
Portable media players
Products introduced in 2013
Tablet computers